Bernardo de Irigoyen Airport is a public use airport located  east of Bernardo de Irigoyen, Misiones, Argentina.

See also
List of airports in Argentina

References

External links 
 Airport record for Bernardo de Irigoyen Airport at Landings.com

Airports in Misiones Province